John C. Oestreicher (August 5, 1936 – January 4, 2011) was an American Democratic politician and lawyer from Wisconsin.

Born in La Crosse, Wisconsin, he graduated from Aquinas High School and studied political science at University of Wisconsin–La Crosse. Oestreicher served in the United States Marine Corps and received a law degree from the University of Wisconsin Law School. Moving to Marshfield, Wisconsin, he served in the Wisconsin State Assembly from 1971 to 1975. Later he served on the Public Service Commission of Wisconsin and the Wisconsin hospital rates board. He moved to Madison, Wisconsin to practice law, dying in Monona, Wisconsin.

Notes

Politicians from La Crosse, Wisconsin
People from Marshfield, Wisconsin
Military personnel from Wisconsin
Aquinas High School (La Crosse, Wisconsin) alumni
Wisconsin lawyers
University of Wisconsin Law School alumni
1936 births
2011 deaths
20th-century American lawyers
Democratic Party members of the Wisconsin State Assembly